The Richmond County Courthouse is a historic courthouse located at Rockingham, Richmond County, North Carolina.  It was designed by Charles Christian Hook and built in 1922–1923.  It is a Renaissance Revival style ashlar veneer building that consists of a three-story central pavilion flanked
by two-story wings.  It features a hexastyle in antis portico.

It was listed on the National Register of Historic Places in 1979.

References

County courthouses in North Carolina
Courthouses on the National Register of Historic Places in North Carolina
Renaissance Revival architecture in North Carolina
Government buildings completed in 1923
Buildings and structures in Randolph County, North Carolina
National Register of Historic Places in Richmond County, North Carolina